Na Hang is a rural district of Tuyên Quang in the Northeast region of Vietnam. As of 2003 the district had a population of 66,561. The district covers an area of 1,472 km². The district capital lies at Na Hang.

References

Districts of Tuyên Quang province
Tuyên Quang province